Judaico may refer to :

The Oath More Judaico or Jewish Oath was a special form of oath that Jews were required to take in European courts of law until the 20th century. 
De bello Judaico, an alternative title to the book The Wars of the Jews.
The Museu Judaico de Belmonte is a Portuguese Jewish museum in Belmonte.